Tapanilan Erä is a Finnish sports club that was founded in 1933, with various teams in different disciplines. It is one of Finland's largest sporting clubs.

Disciplines

Martial Arts
Boxing
Judo
Jujitsu
Karate
Kendo
Ki-Aikido
ZNKR Jōdō

Other
Archery
Athletics
Badminton
Ballet
Bowling
Fencing
Floorball
Rhythmic Gymnastics
Tennis
Volleyball

Floorball
The club's department of floorball was founded in 1990. In terms of licensed players, Erä's department of floorball is the fifth largest floorball club in Finland with 628 licensed players. Both the men's and women's teams play in the Finland's top floorball league, Salibandyliiga. The club also has 9 junior teams (5 boys, 4 girls).

Team Achievements

Men's
2007 Finnish Cup Champions

Women's
1996 Naisten Salibandyliiga Champions
1997 Naisten Salibandyliiga Champions
 1999 EuroFloorball Cup Champions
 2000 Naisten Salibandyliiga Champions
 2007 Naisten Salibandyliiga Champions

Juniors
2004 Czech Open Junior Division Champions

References

External links
 Club Homepage
 Floorball Homepage

Sports teams in Finland
Finnish floorball teams
Sports clubs in Helsinki